Jetted can mean:
 In the context of civil engineering, Cable jetting
 In the context of clothing, adorned with Jet (lignite) or similar black beading
 In the context of clothing, equipped with jetted pockets